The 2016–17 season was Exeter City's 115th year in existence and their fifth consecutive season in League Two. Along with competing in League Two, the club also participated in the FA Cup, EFL Cup and EFL Trophy. Exeter finished the season in 5th place, qualifying for the promotion play-offs. In September, Exeter City broke their all-time record for consecutive home league losses by losing their first five home matches of the season. Exeter City did not record their first league win at their home ground St James Park until mid-December, after 10 attempts. A dramatic upturn in form saw the team rise from the bottom of the league table to a high of 4th. From 31 December 2016 to 4 February 2017, Exeter won all seven of their fixtures, with David Wheeler scoring in each match. With this feat, he equalled and then broke records set by Henry Poulter, Roderick Williams and Alan Beer. Two other records were broken this season because no Exeter City team had ever won seven league games in a row (during the same season). Exeter City also broke their record for most away wins in the league within one season, after their twelfth away triumph at Mansfield Town on 1 April. This season was first in which City qualified for the promotion play-offs in League Two since their relegation from League One in 2012. Exeter overcame Carlisle United to qualify for the play-off final against Blackpool at Wembley. Blackpool beat Exeter 2–1 in the play-off final to earn promotion to the 2017–18 EFL League One.

The season covered the period from 1 July 2016 to 30 June 2017.

Transfers

Transfers in

Transfers out

Loans in

Loans out

Pre-season
On 19 May 2016, seven friendlies were announced on the club website. The majority were played against non-league West Country teams, but City also played Bristol Rovers, Burton Albion and a Cardiff City XI, the former of League One and the latter two of the Championship. City won all seven of the pre-season friendlies, conceding only two goals.

Competitions

League Two

Season summary

August
Exeter City began the season with an away fixture against Blackpool, which resulted in a 2–0 loss for the Grecians. Then followed two consecutive home fixtures, both of which the Grecians went on to lose. Against Hartlepool United, City were up 1–0 at half-time thanks to a 31st-minute goal from Liam McAlinden, but conceded two goals within just two minutes in the final half-hour to lose 2–1. The Grecians also went down to a late goal four days later versus Crawley Town, when Josh Yorwerth scored in the 83rd minute. After these three opening losses, City were bottom of the table. Up next was a trip to Accrington Stanley, where the Grecians won their first league match thanks to two goals in a frantic six minutes in the second half. Ryan Harley opened the scoring for Exeter in the 66th minute before Arron Davies (who left Exeter City in the summer after his contract expired) equalised four minutes later. City were very quickly back ahead when Jake Taylor scored the winning goal in the 72nd minute. The Grecians lost their final August fixture at home to promotion-chasing Portsmouth because of an 85th-minute penalty, but City again failed to take their chances. City scored only three goals in August, picking up a mere three points from five matches. The Grecians sat in the relegation zone at 23rd place, ahead only of Cambridge United.

September
Exeter City's first fixture of September was a tit-for-tat match away at Colchester United. Robbie Simpson scored his first and only league goal since signing in the summer to open the scoring. However City were 2–1 down at half-time, but goals from Ollie Watkins and Joel Grant sealed a narrow win for the Grecians, their second of the season in League Two. City's next match was at Crewe Alexandra and lost this game 2–0 to goals either side of half-time. Then followed the Devon Derby against rivals Plymouth Argyle which City also lost 2–0 with both goals coming early on in the game, causing Exeter to slip back into the relegation zone. Exeter City bounced back out of relegation zone by picking up their third win of the 2016–17 League Two season away at Stevenage with two quickfire goals in the second half from Lee Holmes and Ollie Watkins. City's miserable start to the season was made worse by a record-breaking streak of home losses. After a 2–0 loss at home to Notts County in which the opposition scored two early goals much like Plymouth Argyle a week earlier, the Grecians had lost every one of their first five home matches. However, the two wins away from home that month saw City out of the relegation zone, finishing the month's action in 22nd place.

October
The Grecians fared slightly better in October despite an opening 1–0 away loss at Wycombe Wanderers after a late goal from Adebayo Akinfenwa. City finally picked up their first point at home on 8 October with a goalless draw with Grimsby Town in which goalkeeper Bobby Olejnik didn't feature on the starting line-up for only the second time in over 50 league matches. Instead, Christy Pym featured in goal and would stay in the starting lineup for months to come. In contrast to the Grecians' poor start to the season, City thumped Barnet 4–1 in the following fixture away from home. The League Two top scorer at the time John Akinde opened the scoring for the opposition before Jake Taylor equalized just before half-time. After the break, City scored another three goals while former Grecian Alex Nicholls failed to find the back of net. Despite this heavy win, City once again lost at home the following week to Cambridge United to two early goals, with Joel Grant scoring a consolation goal towards the end of the match. Like their previous away fixture, the Grecians picked up another strong win at Morecambe, with first-half goals from David Wheeler, Joel Grant and Lee Holmes. By the end of October, the Grecians had earned 16 points, 15 of these away from home and stood at 19th in the league table, six points below the play-off places and one point above the relegation zone.

November
The Grecians' first league game of the month was a 3–1 loss to Doncaster Rovers. Reuben Reid opened the scoring in the 51st minute by converting a penalty kick but City conceded three goals in the final twenty minutes of the match, subsequently dropping back into the relegation zone. Exeter City also threw away a result the following week at Carlisle United, going behind in stoppage time to lose 3–2. Reid again opened the scoring, after only 40 seconds, but Charlie Wyke equalized. Lee Holmes then regained the lead for Exeter after 54 until Shaun Miller equalized in the 89th minute. Wyke scored the winner in the seventh minute of stoppage time. After two consecutive losses, the Grecians were bottom of the table for the first time since mid-August. City escaped from the drop zone the following Tuesday after their sixth away league win of the season, at Leyton Orient. The Grecians won 1–0 after a first-half Ollie Watkins goal. Orient manager Alberto Cavasin was sacked soon after this match City stayed in 21st after earning only their second point at home after a 0–0 draw against Luton Town.

December
After elimination from the FA Cup, the Grecians did not have a fixture for the first Saturday of December. City's first match was away at Cheltenham Town, which was won 3–1, seeing the Grecians rise to 17th in the league table. Exeter City won a home match in the league for the first time that season the following week against Mansfield Town, with Ollie Watkins scoring both goals. The Grecians drew 0–0 at Yeovil Town in their Boxing Day fixture. New Year's Eve saw Exeter City beat Newport County 4–1 at Rodney Parade. Ollie Watkins scored his first hat-trick in professional football, the first hat-trick any Exeter City player had scored in the league since 1993. This result meant City finished the year at 11th place in the league table.

January
City began the year with a 4–0 thrashing of Leyton Orient where Ryan Harley scored a brace shortly after returning from injury. This win extended their unbeaten run to seven matches, seeing the Grecians rise from 24th in the league to 11th in that time. City were without a match on Saturday 7 January due to their fixture against Wycombe Wanderers being postponed because of the Chairboys' involvement in the third round of the FA Cup. After the few fixtures that took place that day, City dropped to 12th in the league table. The Grecians bounced back up the table with a 3–0 win at Grimsby Town, with Ollie Watkins, David Wheeler and Reuben Reid scoring their 10th, 9th and 5th goals of the season respectively. City won 3–0 again the following week, this time at home to Colchester United. Reid, Wheeler and Liam McAlinden scored while Ollie Watkins gained a hat-trick of assists. After this result, the Grecians rose to 9th in the League Table, only one point off the play-offs. Exeter City climbed into 7th place in the league table, the final play-off spot, after a 1–0 win away at Portsmouth, whom were also promotion contenders. City again triumphed over a fellow play-off contender by beating Wycombe Wanderers 4–2, moving up to fourth place.

February
The Grecians carried their excellent form into February with a 4–0 thrashing of Crewe Alexandra with David Wheeler breaking the all-time Exeter City record for consecutive matches scored in after his brace, meaning he had scored seven matches in a row. Jordan Moore-Taylor and Lloyd James also scored in the match. City were then only four points behind third-placed Carlisle United. Exeter City also won seven consecutive matches in the league (within a single season) for the first time. Exeter's unbeaten run was ended by rivals Plymouth Argyle in a 3–0 drubbing at Home Park. This was the Grecians' heaviest defeat of the season so far and the club dropped to 5th in the league table. Exeter dropped further down the league table to 6th after losing a 2–0 lead at 90 minutes to draw 2–2 at Notts County. Jake Taylor was sent off in the 87th minute. City drew again in their next game at home against Stevenage, with Reuben Reid equalizing early in the second half. Yet another draw was to follow the next game at home against Blackpool, where City fought back after finding themselves 2–0 down after 39 minutes. This stretched their home unbeaten run to 8 matches. City ended their winless streak with a 2–1 victory over Crawley Town on Shrove Tuesday, their 11th away league victory of the season.

March
City had a very poor start to the month after losing 3–1 to relegation-threatened Hartlepool United. Much like the reverse fixture back in August, Exeter forfeited a 1–0 half-time lead. Subsequently, the Reds dropped to 7th. Exeter's promotion hopes were dealt another blow after a second consecutive loss to a bottom-half side, this time Accrington Stanley who beat City 2–0. Despite only gaining 6 points from 7 matches, City remained in the play-off qualification places. The Reds bounced back with a 3–0 win against Cheltenham Town on 14 March with Reuben Reid netting twice. Despite gaining a credible away draw the following weekend at Luton Town, Exeter's position in the play-off places was made even more precarious by wins for Blackpool and Mansfield Town. The Grecians pulled off an incredible comeback to draw 3–3 against Yeovil Town despite being 3–0 down after 87 minutes, with Wheeler, Brown and Reid rescuing the team from dropping out of the play-off places.

April
City pulled off another stunning comeback the following Saturday, this time at Mansfield Town after going 1–0 down before half-time. The Reds won 2–1 thanks to goal in the 84th minute from Ryan Harley and a 97th-minute spot-kick which was converted by Reuben Reid. There was to be no come-back the following week as Newport County successfully defended their 1–0 lead to move closer to League Two survival, while the Grecians remained in 6th as other results went their way. Exeter returned to winning ways with a victory against Barnet on Good Friday. Moore-Taylor and Wheeler both scored with the first six minutes and City held on their lead despite a second-half goal from John Akinde. City lost on Easter Monday at Cambridge thanks to a first-half goal from Leon Legge. At this point in the season with 3 matches remaining, there was a mere 6-point gap between 4th place and 13th place in the league table and City were precariously only 3 points above 13th despite sitting in 6th. Exeter increased their cushion over 8th place to 3 points with a 3–1 win over Morecambe at home. David Wheeler scored his 18th goal of the season in what was yet another thrilling late surge of goalscoring by the Grecians. City assured qualification to the playoffs on 29 April after a 3–1 away victory over then-leaders Doncaster Rovers with goals from Moore-Taylor, Wheeler and McAlinden. Former Grecian James Coppinger netted for Doncaster.

May
In a repeat of their reverse fixture back in November, City surrendered a 2–1 lead to lose 2–3 to Carlisle United. The Cumbrians netted two spot-kicks in this match, a result which earned them 6th-place in the league table and meant Exeter and Carlisle would face off in the League Two promotion play-offs.

In the first leg of the play-off semi-final against Carlisle, the teams played out a 3–3 draw. City opened the scoring in the 15th minute after Grant scored a header, but were pegged back a quarter of an hour later after an own goal by Moore-Taylor. Just before half-time, Harley scored to give City back the lead. Wheeler scored after 56 minutes to extend Exeter's lead to 3–1. Carlisle then scored two goals in two minutes to bring the score to 3–3. Joel Grant finished the match with a goal and two assists.

The second leg saw a very late winner for Exeter, scored by loanee Jack Stacey. City had gone 2–0 up with both goals scored by Ollie Watkins in the 10th and 79th minutes, but Carlisle scored twice in the final ten minutes of normal time to make it 2–2. Jack Stacey then scored his first goal for Exeter in the 95th minute to send the Grecians to Wembley.

Blackpool overcame Exeter in the play-off final, starting the game very well by scoring in the 2nd minute through Brad Potts. David Wheeler then equalised after 40 minutes and the first half finished 1–1. Mark Cullen scored the winning goal for Blackpool in the 64th minute.

League table

Results summary
Note: does not include play-off matches.

Results by round

Matches
On 22 June 2016, the fixtures for the 2016–17 season were announced.

August

September

October

November

December

January

February

March

April

May

Play-off semi-final

Play-off final

FA Cup
The Grecians were beaten 3–1 at home in the FA Cup First Round by Luton Town after conceding two penalties The first penalty was conceded after 11 minutes and was converted by Danny Hylton. Reuben Reid then equalized in the 39th minute. Luton regained the lead after 71 minutes when Glen Rea scored. Despite Town going down to 10 men soon after, they finished off the game after Hylton scored his second goal from the spot after 86 minutes. This penalty was given after a shove by Troy Archibald-Henville, in his first appearance for the Grecians after a long injury lay-off.

EFL Cup
Exeter City won their match against Brentford in the first round after Ryan Harley scored in the 100th minute. Ethan Ampadu became the youngest ever player to be fielded by the club in this match, aged just 15 years, 10 months and 26 days. In the second round of the EFL Cup, City lost 3–1 to Premier League side Hull City. Jake Taylor had opened the scoring after 24 minutes but Adama Diomande equalized after two minutes and scored again in the second half. Robert Snodgrass scored straight from a free kick to ensure Exeter's elimination from the competition.

EFL Trophy
Exeter City began their EFL Trophy campaign with a loss to League One side Oxford United. The Grecians were 2–0 down after 36 minutes but Matt Jay scored his first goal for the club just before half-time and Liam McAlinden equalized after 61 minutes. However, United scored twice in three minutes to condemn City to an opening defeat.

The Grecians won their next match against the Chelsea F.C. Reserves and Academy. Ollie Watkins opened the scoring after only 2 minutes before David Wheeler scored in the 25th minute to give City a 2–0 lead at half-time. Liam McAlinden made it 3–0 shortly after the break. Ike Ugbo scored twice in the second half but Exeter held on to their lead.

City were then knocked out of the League Trophy after a loss on penalties to Swindon Town after Wheeler cancelled out a Luke Norris opener. Striker Robbie Simpson played as a centre-back for the first half of this match due to club's ongoing injury crisis. Swindon won the shoot-out 4–2 after Lloyd James and Lee Holmes missed from the spot.

Squad statistics
Source:

Numbers in parentheses denote appearances as substitute.
Players with squad numbers struck through and marked  left the club during the playing season.
Players with names in italics and marked * were on loan from another club for the whole of their season with Exeter.
Players listed with no appearances have been in the matchday squad but only as unused substitutes.
Key to positions: GK – Goalkeeper; DF – Defender; MF – Midfielder; FW – Forward

References

Exeter City
Exeter City F.C. seasons